Telman Pasha oglu Pashayev (born 5 March 1953, in Baku, Azerbaijan SSR) is a former Soviet wrestler

References

1953 births
Living people
Soviet male sport wrestlers
Azerbaijani male sport wrestlers
World Wrestling Championships medalists
European Wrestling Championships medalists